Pietragalla is a town and comune in the province of Potenza, in the Southern Italian region of Basilicata. It is bordered by the comuni of Acerenza, Avigliano, Cancellara, Forenza, Potenza, Vaglio Basilicata.

Cities and towns in Basilicata